The Electrician and IT Workers' Union (EL og IT) is a trade union in Norway.

The union was formed by the 1999 merger of the Norwegian Union of Electricians and Power Station Workers, and the Norwegian Telecommunication and Data Workers' Union.

EL og IT Forbundet has a membership of over 42,000 and is affiliated with the Norwegian Confederation of Trade Unions (LO).

Presidents
1999: Anders Kristoffersen
2001: Hans O. Felix
2015: Jan Olav Andersen

References

Norwegian Confederation of Trade Unions
Trade unions established in 1999
Trade unions in Norway
1999 establishments in Norway